Donald Kennedy McSween (born June 9, 1964) is an American former professional ice hockey player who played in the National Hockey League (NHL) for two clubs in the late 1980s and early 1990s.

Playing career
A defenseman known for his adept puck-handling skills as well as his quick mobility, McSween, a two-time All American, was successful during his college career at Michigan State University, leading the team to the NCAA Division I Men's Ice Hockey National Championship in 1986.

He was quite successful while playing in the minor league. Following his impressive college career, McSween went on to play for the Buffalo Sabres (NHL). He was selected 84th in the 1983 NHL Draft, with a height of 5'11" a weight of 197 lb, and shooting left. After this stint, he played for the Rochester Americans (AHL), and the San Diego Gulls (IHL). In fact, McSween continues to hold American records for points scored by a defenseman in a career: 215 goals. In 1989–90 McSween was selected as an AHL First-Team All-Star. McSween also won myriad awards playing as a member of the Americans. He won five straight team Defensive Player of the Year awards (1987–92).

He also had a short but notable career as a player for the Mighty Ducks of Anaheim. However, his chances of becoming a prominent National Hockey League player were severed after a serious arm injury in January 1995 at Winnipeg, when involved in a fight with another player, Keith Tkachuk. The tendons in McSween's left wrist were severely damaged after being severed by Tkachuk's skate. The nerve and tendon injury never fully healed, preventing him from being able to fully close his left hand, his shooting arm, effectively ending McSween's professional career. Ironically, McSween had severed the Achilles tendon of another promising player, Teemu Selänne, earlier in his career (Selänne would go on to make a full recovery, playing for 2 decades). After his injury McSween went on to play in the AHL (American Hockey League) for the Baltimore Bandits; in the IHL (International Hockey League) for the Grand Rapids Griffins and later Milwaukee Admirals; and in the UHL  (United Hockey League) for the Muskegon Fury.

Personal life
McSween lives in Grand Rapids, Michigan, working as an electrical engineer and a volunteer coach for local Youth Hockey Leagues. He is raising two boys and a daughter with his wife. As a youth, he played in the 1977 Quebec International Pee-Wee Hockey Tournament with a minor ice hockey team from Detroit.

Career statistics

Regular season and playoffs

International

Awards and honors

References

External links

NY Times
1983 Entry Draft Don McSween
MSU Ice Hockey 1983
McSween Named MSU Distinguished Alumnus Award Winner
Description of Injury

1964 births
Living people
American men's ice hockey defensemen
Baltimore Bandits players
Buffalo Sabres draft picks
Buffalo Sabres players
Grand Rapids Griffins (IHL) players
Ice hockey people from Detroit
Michigan State Spartans men's ice hockey players
Mighty Ducks of Anaheim players
Milwaukee Admirals (IHL) players
Muskegon Fury players
NCAA men's ice hockey national champions
Rochester Americans players
San Diego Gulls (IHL) players
AHCA Division I men's ice hockey All-Americans